Retford Oaks Academy is a  coeducational secondary school and sixth form located in the market town of Retford, Nottinghamshire, England, situated in the district of Bassetlaw.

Academic performance
The school has improved from a poor starting point since opening in 2003. The number of students achieving 5 or more A* to C grades at GCSE has risen from 20% in 2006 to 49% in 2011. The opening of the separate sixth form centre with The Elizabethan Academy, effectively operating as a sixth form college, has produced A level results above the England average.

Ofsted
Retford Oaks Academy was last inspected in July 2017, with the overall judgement being that it is a ‘good’ school. The report highlighted the steps that have been taken to ensure a positive, safe and successful learning experience for all students.

History
The school was established in 2003 with the amalgamation of two of the schools in Retford. His Royal Highness, The Duke of Kent formally opened the school in October 2008. In September 2009 the school was designated as a specialist sports college with its second subject being Mathematics. In September 2011 the school officially became academy as part of the Diverse Academies Trust.

Older schools: King Edward VI Grammar School and the Girls' High School 
The King Edward VI School was on London Road. It was previously known as the King Edward VI Grammar School and the oldest part of the school buildings (opened in August 1857) was designed by Decimus Burton. The Grammar School magazine was called The Retfordian. The school motto was Ex Pulvere Palma. In later years the school's senior houses were Edward, Foljambe, Gough, and Overend.  The junior houses were Bescoby, Darrell, Laycock, and Mason (all named after school benefactors).

The school usually traced its original foundation back to Thomas Gunthorpe of Babworth in 1519 although there are references to a still earlier school in the town. It was refounded around 1551 during the reign of King Edward VI.  It subsequently had a chequered history, twice coming close to collapse during the 19th century. The school accepted boarders from at least the 17th century onwards, but the last boarders left in 1938. During  the Second World War a number of boys from the Great Yarmouth Grammar School were evacuated to Retford (from 1940 to 1944), and were taught in classrooms at King Edward VI Grammar School.

Headmasters of King Edward VI Grammar School

?1551 Rev. Christopher Say, LL.B., Jesus College, Cambridge

1588 Rev. George Turvyn, MA, MA, Trinity College, Cambridge [or George Turvin]

?1605 Rev Thomas Cooper, MA, Corpus Christi College, Cambridge

1628  Rev. Nicholas Dickons, MA, Pembroke College, Cambridge [or Nicholas Dickens]

1638 Thomas Stacey, MA, Corpus Christi College, Cambridge

1642 Rev. Thomas Dand, MA, Trinity College, Cambridge

1669 Robert Pinchbeck.

1670 Henry Boawre, MA, St John's College, Cambridge 
[or Henry Boare/Henry Bower]

1702 Rev. Thomas Moore, St John's College, Cambridge

1708 Rev. Henry Stevenson

1748 Rev. Seth Ellis Stevenson, MA, Peterhouse, Cambridge

A diary kept by Seth Ellis Stevenson between 1752-55 survives in Wigan Archives. Another diary from 1760-77 is in Nottingham University Library.

1793 Rev. William Tyre, MA, Pembroke College, Oxford

1801 Rev. William Mould, MA, Peterhouse, Cambridge

1838 Rev. William Henry Trentham, MA, St John's College, Cambridge

Trentham resigned and died in 1842. From 1842-47 no headmaster was appointed, although the usher, James Holderness, continued to teach a few pupils

1847 Rev. John Henry Brown, MA, Trinity College, Cambridge (later 
headmaster of Brewood Grammar School, Staffordshire)

Following Brown's departure, no headmaster was appointed between 1850-57. Henry Clarke Mitchinson, the usher and sole remaining teacher, was acting headmaster, but his alleged harshness in corporal punishment led to various complaints and to an eventual court case.

1857 Rev. Jonathan Page Clayton, MA, Caius College, Cambridge

1866 Rev. Edward Swinden Sanderson, MA, Corpus Christi College, 
Cambridge

1870   Rev. Frederick Richard Pentreath, MA, DD, Worcester College, Oxford

1873 Rev. Alfred John Church, MA, Lincoln College, Oxford

1880 Rev. Oliver Carter Cockrem, MA, LLD, Trinity College, Dublin

1886 Rev. Thomas Gough, BSc, FGS, London University

Gough was formerly headmaster of Elmfield College, York. Historian A D Grounds commented that "he may with justice be called the school's second founder".

1919 Charles Roland Skrimshire, MA, Merton College, Oxford

1926 Charles William Pilkington-Rogers, MA, BSc., Queens’ College,  Cambridge

1950 John Charles Havelock Gover, MA, Emmanuel College, Cambridge

c1972 Tom Savage

c1978 Michael Allen

After amalgamating with the Sir Frederick Milner Secondary School in 1979, the new establishment was known simply as the King Edward VI School until the eventual second merger into the Oaks School.

Earlier there was also Retford High School for Girls on Pelham Road – a Girls' grammar school.

Previous schools up to 2003
Before 1979, the former Sir Frederick Milner Secondary School (an all-male secondary modern school) was on Pennington Walk, with around 500 boys, in the east of the town. This became part of the King Edward VI School, a voluntary controlled school, and was used as the sixth form site prior to the new Post-16 centre being opened in 2007. The former site will become residential properties. Sir Frederick Milner was the Conservative MP from 1890 to 1906 for Bassetlaw.

The former Retford Oaks School was on a site towards Ordsall near the former leisure centre, which was the former Ordsall Hall School on Ordsall Road (now the Post-16 Centre). This merged with the King Edward VI School in 2003 forming the current school.

Regeneration

Similar to five other schools in Bassetlaw (two in Worksop and one in Tuxford, Bircotes and The Elizabethan High School in Retford), the school underwent an extensive rebuilding programme under PFI funding. It was not possible to develop the King Edward VI School site as a Post-16 Centre (even though the county council wanted to), because the county council did not own the property so an entirely new site was built on Babworth Road. This site is for ages 11–16. On the former Ordsall Hall site, a new leisure centre was built (nextdoor) in January 2008 and a separate Post-16 (sixth form) Centre was built in September 2007, when the 11–16 site opened as well. Worksop has also had a new sixth form (and leisure centre) built under the same PFI contract.

Notable former pupils

King Edward VI School
 JS Clayden, vocalist for British musical group Pitchshifter, founder of PSI Records

King Edward VI Grammar School

 Anthony Barber, Chancellor of the Exchequer from 1970 to 1974 and Conservative MP
 Wing Commander Edward Barton CBE, electronic engineer and chief signals and radar officer of the RAF Pathfinder Force, helped to develop the Oboe navigation system
 John Hedley Brooke, historian of science
 Dr Michael Clark, Conservative MP
 Doc Cox, musician and former television journalist
 John Glasby, writer
 Sir Stuart Goodwin, industrialist and philanthropist
 Dick Herrick, Anglican priest
 Frank Fairbairn Laming, Anglican priest
 Jim McCairns pilot
 Samuel Milner, physicist
 Air Marshal Sir Alec Morris KBE, CB, Chief Engineer from 1981 to 1983 of the RAF
 John Pater CB, civil servant largely responsible for creating the NHS (England and Wales) in 1948
 Ian Robinson, literary critic and English lecturer
 John Taylor, publisher, essayist, and writer
 Sir Lionel Thompson CBE, Deputy Master and Comptroller of the Royal Mint from 1950 to 1957
 John Warham, photographer
 Joe Wright CMG, UK Ambassador from 1975–78 to Ivory Coast, Upper Volta and Niger

Sir Frederick Milner Secondary Modern (to 1979)
 Derek Randall, England cricketer
 Tim Stockdale, equestrian and show-jumper

See also
 The Elizabethan High School – the other Retford comprehensive on Hallcroft Road.
 King Edward VI Grammar School, Retford - London Road
 Retford Post 16 Centre – Post 16 centre run in partnership with The Elizabethan High School
 Listed buildings in Retford

References

External links
 Retford Oaks High School
 PE Dept
 Bassetlaw PFI
 History of Retford Grammar School
 Old Retfordian
 Post 16 Centre
 EduBase
 King Edward VI School photo

News items
 Attack in August 2006
 Independent September 1998

Educational institutions established in 2003
Secondary schools in Nottinghamshire
People educated at King Edward VI Grammar School, Retford
Retford
Academies in Nottinghamshire
King Edward VI Schools
2003 establishments in England